Leuthard II may refer to:
Leuthari II (fl. c. 643), Duke of Alamannia
Leuthard II of Paris (born c. 806, died 858 or 869), seventh Count of Paris